Marie-Ange Kramo (born 20 February 1979 in Toulouse) is a French women's international footballer who plays as a forward. She is a member of the France women's national football team. She was part of the team at the 2003 FIFA Women's World Cup.

References

External links
 
 

1979 births
Living people
French women's footballers
France women's international footballers
Footballers from Toulouse
2003 FIFA Women's World Cup players
Women's association football forwards
Toulouse FC (women) players
Black French sportspeople